The Indonesia Billie Jean King Cup team represents Indonesia in Billie Jean King Cup tennis competition and are governed by the Indonesian Tennis Association.  They have not competed in the World Groups since 2006.

History
Indonesia competed in its first Fed Cup in 1969.  Their best result was reaching the quarterfinals in 1991.

In 2006, Indonesia qualified for World Group II, but refused to play Israel and forfeited their play-off match against the Israel Fed Cup team in Tel Aviv, and hence was relegated.  Israel thus won by forfeit, and advanced to the 2007 Fed Cup World Group II. It was reported that the Indonesian Tennis Association was instructed to forfeit by the Indonesian government. 

The International Tennis Federation's President Francesco Ricci Bitti said the Federation was saddened by the decision. The ITF fined the Indonesian Tennis Association $31,600, and banned it from 2007's tournament. The fine consisted of $20,000 to host Israel, $6,600 to compensate the ITF`s spending on preparations for the Israel Fed Cup, and $5,000 for pulling out of the match. Indonesia had been in the World Group II playoffs in 2007, but the sanction relegated Indonesia to Group II of the Asia/Oceanic Zone in 2008.

Results
From 2008 to 2016, Indonesia largely alternated between Asia/Oceania Zone Group II and Group I. In the 2016 Fed Cup, was not able to achieve promotion to Group I, and hence will again start the 2017 campaign in Group II. Sri Utaminingsih was the Indonesian coach in 2016.

See also
Billie Jean King Cup
Indonesia Davis Cup team
Boycotts of Israel in individual sports

References

External links

Billie Jean King Cup teams
Fed Cup
Fed Cup